Shurloq (also Romanized as Shūrloq; also known as Shoorlogh, Shūrlūkh, and Shūrrukh) is a village in Marzdaran Rural District, Marzdaran District, Sarakhs County, Razavi Khorasan Province, Iran. At the 2006 census, its population was 412, in 90 families.

References 

Populated places in Sarakhs County